Robert Edward Ogren (February 9, 1922 – July 13, 2005) was an American zoologist.

Life
Ogren was born in 1922 in Jamestown, New York, son of David Paul and Mary Gladys (born Ahlstrom) Ogren. While in secondary school, he developed a strong interest in natural history and started to study microscopic biology at home.

He earned a bachelor's degree in Zoology in 1947 from Wheaton College and a master's degree from Northwestern University in 1948. He married his wife, Jean Blose Jackson, on 28 August 1948, and their first son, Paul Robert Ogren, was born on 24 June 1949.

In 1953 he received a Ph.D. degree in Zoology and Physiology from the University of Illinois. His doctoral thesis was entitled "Concepts of Early Tapeworm Development Derived From Comparative Embryology of Oncospheres".

He began his academic career in 1953 as an assistant professor of biology at Ursinus College, remaining until 1957. During this time he had his second son, Philip Edward Ogren, born in 1955.

From 1957 to 1963, he worked also as an assistant professor of biology at Dickinson College, acting as chairman of the biology department from 1959 to 1960. In 1963 he moved to Wilkes College (currently Wilkes University) as an associate professor of biology, becoming full professor in 1981 and an emeritus professor in 1986. During his tenure, he developed basic research in the development of tapeworm hexacanth embryos. From 1980 on he also started to work on the biology of land planarians.

In 1987 he began a series of publications in association with Dr. Masaharu Kawakatsu entitled the "Land Planarian Indices Series" where they reviewed the taxonomy of all land planarian species known at the time.

He died in his sleep on 13 July 2005 while on vacation at the Chautauqua Institution, New York.

Selected works

References

1922 births
2005 deaths
20th-century American zoologists
Wheaton College (Illinois) alumni
Northwestern University alumni
University of Illinois alumni
American parasitologists
Helminthologists
Ursinus College faculty
Dickinson College faculty
Wilkes University faculty